Rogério Corrêa may refer to:

Rogério Corrêa (footballer, born 1979), full name Rogério Corrêa de Oliveira, Brazilian football former defender and current manager
Rogério Corrêa (footballer, born 1981), full name Rogério de Albuquerque Corrêa, Brazilian football former defender and current manager